Adrian Price-Whelan is an American astronomer and researcher who is known for discovering the star cluster Price-Whelan 1. He is the son of Michael Whelan.

Education 
Price-Whelan holds a bachelor's degree in physics from New York University and master's and doctoral degrees in astronomy from Columbia University in the city of New York.

Career 
Price-Whelan is currently a research scientist at the Center for Computational Astrophysics at the Flatiron Institute in New York. He has expertise in computational analysis, analyzing chemical data for large numbers of stars in the Milky Way and interpretation of kinematics.

References

External links 

Living people
Date of birth missing (living people)
Place of birth missing (living people)
American astronomers
Year of birth missing (living people)